The pesto alla trapanese, is a Sicilian variation of the genovese pesto, typical of the Province of Trapani. It is made of garlic, basil, almonds, grated pecorino, tomatoes, salt, and pepper, and bound with extra virgin olive oil.
 
The dish was introduced in ancient times by Genovese ships, coming from the East and stopping at the port of Trapani, who brought the tradition of agliata, a sort of pesto sauce based on garlic and walnuts, which was then developed by Trapani sailors with the products of their land, notably tomato and almonds.

"Busiati with pesto trapanese" is listed as a traditional Italian food product (P.A.T.) by the Ministry of Agricultural, Food and Forestry Policies.

See also

 Sicilian cuisine
 List of Sicilian dishes

References

Cuisine of Sicily
Province of Trapani
Italian sauces